Airport Terminal 1 is a station on the Taoyuan Airport MRT located in Dayuan, Taoyuan City, Taiwan. The station is located under Terminal 1 of Taoyuan International Airport and opened for commercial service on 2 March 2017.

This underground station has one island platform and two tracks. Both Express and Commuter trains stop at this station. It opened for trial service on 2 February 2017, and for commercial service 2 March 2017.

Station construction was overseen by the Bureau of High Speed Rail (under the Ministry of Transportation and Communications).

History
 2017-03-02: The station opened for commercial service with the opening of the Taipei-Huanbei section of the Airport MRT.

Gallery

See also
 Taoyuan Metro

References

2017 establishments in Taiwan
Airport railway stations in Taiwan
Railway stations opened in 2017
Taoyuan Airport MRT stations
Taoyuan International Airport